Martijn Deijkers (sometimes spelled Deykers), known professionally as Martyn, is a Dutch producer and DJ from Eindhoven, currently based in Washington D.C. in the United States. He is the son of Dutch former footballer Gerrie Deijkers.  He started his career by DJing drum and bass in 1996, but began to include more of a dubstep influence after first hearing Kode9's "Sine of the Dub". He released his first 12" singles in 2005, incorporating elements of both techno and jungle. Deijkers' first album, Great Lengths, was released in 2009. In 2010 he released Fabric 50, the 50th installment of the Fabric Mix DJ series. Martyn's second studio album, Ghost People, was released in 2011 on the American label Brainfeeder.

Discography

Studio albums
 Great Lengths (2009)
 Ghost People (2011)
 The Air Between Words (2014)
 Voids (2018)

Compilation albums
 Fabric 50 (2010)

EPs
 Newspeak (2013)
 Block The Box (2015)

Singles
 "Get Down" b/w "Black Lies" (2005)
 "Nxt 2 U" b/w "Deepwood" (2005)
 "Cloud Convention" b/w "Believe It" (2006)
 "I Wonder Why" b/w "Share My Wings" (2006)
 "Velvet" b/w "Twenty Four" (2007)
 "Broken" (2007)
 "Natural Selection" b/w "Vancouver" (2008)
 "Left Hander" b/w "Shook Up" (2010)
 "Masks" b/w "Viper" (2011)
 "Hello Darkness" (2012)

References

External links
 
 

1975 births
Living people
Dutch record producers
Dutch DJs
Dubstep musicians
Hyperdub artists
People from Geldrop
People from Ashburn, Virginia
Electronic dance music DJs